In mathematics, Fisher's equation (named after statistician and biologist Ronald Fisher) also known as the Kolmogorov–Petrovsky–Piskunov equation (named after Andrey Kolmogorov, Ivan Petrovsky, and Nikolai Piskunov), KPP equation or Fisher–KPP equation is the partial differential equation:It is a kind of reaction–diffusion system that can be used to model population growth and wave propagation.

Details
Fisher's equation belongs to the class of reaction–diffusion equation: in fact, it is one of the simplest semilinear reaction-diffusion equations, the one which has the inhomogeneous term

Such equations occur, e.g., in ecology, physiology, combustion, crystallization, plasma physics, and in general phase transition problems.

Fisher proposed this equation in his 1937 paper The wave of advance of advantageous genes in the context of population dynamics to describe the spatial spread of an advantageous allele and explored its travelling wave solutions. 
For every wave speed  ( in dimensionless form) it admits travelling wave solutions of the form

where  is increasing and

That is, the solution switches from the equilibrium state u = 0 to the equilibrium state u = 1. No such solution exists for c < 2. The wave shape for a given wave speed is unique.  The travelling-wave solutions are stable against near-field perturbations, but not to far-field perturbations which can thicken the tail.  One can prove using the comparison principle and super-solution theory that all solutions with compact initial data converge to waves with the minimum speed.

For the special wave speed , all solutions can be found in a closed form,  with

Proof of the existence of travelling wave solutions and analysis of their properties is often done by the phase space method.

KPP equation 
In the same year (1937) as Fisher, Kolmogorov, Petrovsky and Piskunov introduced the more general reaction-diffusion equation

where  is a sufficiently smooth function with the properties that
This too has the travelling wave solutions discussed above.

The minimum speed of a KPP-type traveling wave is given by

which differs from other type of waves, see for example ZFK-type waves.

See also
 ZFK equation
 List of plasma (physics) articles
 Allen–Cahn equation

References

External links 
Fisher's equation on MathWorld.
Fisher equation on EqWorld.

Partial differential equations
Population ecology